Ludovic Lalanne (23 April 1815, Paris – 16 May 1898, Paris) was a French historian and librarian. The engineer and politician Léon Lalanne (1811–1892) was his brother.

Biography 
Lalanne was a student at the lycée Louis-le-Grand and later at the École des Chartes, where he was graduated archivist paleographer in 1841. He was librarian of the Institut.

He was a resident member of the Comité des travaux historiques et scientifiques, archivist of the Société de l'École des chartes and president of the Société de l'histoire de France.

Publications 
Lalanne published many works (sometimes in collaboration) including:
 Essai sur le feu grégeois et sur la poudre à canon, 1845
 Les Pèlerinages en Terre Sainte avant les Croisades, 1845
 Curiosités littéraires, 1845
 Curiosités bibliographiques, 1845
 Journal d'un bourgeois de Paris sous François Ier (1515–1536), 1854
 Curiosités philologiques, géographiques et ethnologiques, 1855
 Les Tragiques d'Augrippa d'Abigné, 1857
 Mémoires de Marguerite de Valois, 1858
 Curiosités biographiques, 1858
 Œuvres de Malherbe, 1862
 Dictionnaire historique de la France, 1872–77
 Mémoires de Roger de Rabutin, comte de Bussy, 1882
 Le Livre de fortune de Jehan Cousin, recueil de deux cents dessins inédits, 1883
 Œuvres complètes de Pierre de Bourdeille, seigneur de Brantôme, 1864–82
 Journal du voyage du Cavalier Bernin en France, 1885
 Œuvres de Lagrange, 1892
 Brantôme sa vie et ses écrits, 1896
Lalanne also realised the inventory of the manuscripts of Paris Observatory Library.

References

External links 
 Ludovic Lalanne on data.bnf.fr
 L'annuaire prosopographique du  Comité des travaux historiques et scientifiques, file on Ludovic Lalanne 

Lycée Louis-le-Grand alumni
École Nationale des Chartes alumni
French librarians
French bibliographers
19th-century French historians
1815 births
Writers from Paris
1898 deaths